The term maya refers to a folk taxonomy often used in the Philippines to refer to a variety of small, commonly observed passerine birds, including a number of sparrows, finches and munias.

This group includes Lonchura atricapilla, specifically referred to by the common name "mayang pula" ("red maya"), which was recognized as the national bird of the Philippines until 1995, when then-President Fidel V. Ramos formally transferred that honorific to the Philippine eagle.

It also includes the Eurasian tree sparrow, Passer montanus, introduced from Europe and locally referred to as "mayang simbahan" - an invasive species so predominant in urban areas that many urban Filipinos mistakenly think it is the only species referred to as "maya."

Species 
Some of the species counted under the category of "maya" include:
 Lonchura atricapilla - locally referred to as "mayang pula" ("red maya"), the national bird of the Philippines until 1995.  Formerly considered conspecific with Lonchura malacca, with which it is still often confused.  Also sometimes referred to as mayang bungol (deaf maya), or mayang bukid (ricefield maya).
 Lonchura leucogastra - locally referred to as "mayang bato" ("rock maya")
 Lonchura punctulata - locally referred to "mayang paking (which is another variation of "deaf maya") 
 Padda oryzivora - locally referred to "mayang costa" ("coast maya")
 Passer montanus - the Eurasian tree sparrow, introduced from Europe and locally referred to as "mayang simbahan" ("church maya")
 Oriolus steerii - the Philippine oriole is also sometimes generically referred to as "maya", and is sometimes even confused for Lonchura atricapilla or Passer montanus due to the imprecise naming.

Confusion 
However, due to the forces of globalization and urbanization, Filipinos are becoming increasingly less familiar with the identity of even species around them.  As a result, these categories of maya are becoming less and less well known, and the use of the catch-all name "maya" has result in species being confused for one another, despite readily observable morphological differences.

In urban areas in particular, where the Eurasian tree sparrow has become predominant as an invasive species, "maya" is often mistakenly thought to be the name of this single species - even if it was not even originally native to the Philippines.

The Philippine oriole (Oriolus steerii) is also sometimes generically referred to as "maya", and is sometimes even confused for Lonchura atricapilla or Passer montanus due to the imprecise naming.

References 

 
Birds in popular culture
Bird common names